Andika Hazrumy (born 16 December 1985) is the formerly Vice Governor of Banten since 2017 to 2022. He is the son of former Governor of Banten Ratu Atut Chosiyah.

Political career 

Hazrumy started his political career when he was elected as the member of the Regional Representative Council in 2009.

At the 2014 legislative election, Hazrumy was elected as the member of the People's Representative Council. In 2019, he ran as the running mate of Wahidin Halim in the 2017 Banten gubernatorial election. The pair defeated incumbent Rano Karno and Hazrumy was elected as the deputy governor for the term 2017–2022.

References 

1985 births
Living people
21st-century Indonesian politicians
Golkar politicians
Politicians from Banten
People from Bandung